The Libertarian Party of Utah is the Utah affiliate of the Libertarian Party. It was founded in 1971 under Chair Karl Bray, and was the first state affiliate of the national Libertarian party to achieve ballot access for its candidates (1976).

The State Chair is currently held by Barry Short, the Vice Chair is Tessa Stitzer. Taylor Smith serves as Treasurer and Susan Baird is the party Secretary.

The party, commonly abbreviated as UTLP, holds its biennial Organizing Convention in April of odd-numbered years, and Nominating Convention in April of even numbered years.

Past and present office holders
 Mark B. Madsen – Utah Senate, District 13 (2004–2016; left the GOP and registered as a Libertarian on 25 July 2016)
 Willy Marshall – Mayor of Big Water, Utah (2001–2005)
 Alex Joseph – Mayor of Big Water, Utah (1986–1995)
 Apollo Pazell – Council member, Copperton
 Tessa Stitzer – Council member, Copperton

Electoral performance

Presidential

Gubernatorial

Notable people
 Mark Skousen
 Andrew McCullough

References

External links 
 Official website

Utah
Political parties in Utah